"Oceanic" is a science fiction novella  by Australian writer Greg Egan, published in 1998. It won the 1999 Hugo Award for Best Novella.

Publication history 
"Oceanic" was first published in the August 1998 edition of Asimov's Science Fiction by Dell Magazines. Editor Gardner Dozois republished it in The Year's Best Science Fiction: Sixteenth Annual Collection (1999) and The Best of the Best Volume 2: 20 Years of the Best Short Science Fiction Novels (2007). It was again republished in Greg Egan's collection Dark Integers and Other Stories (2008) and in Egan's collection Oceanic (2009).

Reception

In 1999, "Oceanic" won the Hugo Award for Best Novella, Locus Award best novella, and Asimov's Reader Poll for best novella. It also won two foreign short story awards: the 2000 Hayakawa's SF Magazine Reader's Award and the 2001 Seiun Award. "Oceanic" was also a finalist in the 1998 Aurealis Award for best science fiction short story, a long list nominee for the 1999 James Tiptree Jr Memorial Award, and a short-list nominee for the 1999 HOMer Award for best novella.

Synopsis
The story follows Martin, a Freelander living on the oceans of Covenant.  As a boy he has a religious experience that shapes his life for years to come.  As he grows into manhood his experiences and studies begin to conflict with his deep rooted faith.  Eventually he joins a small circle of scholars studying the effects of one of Covenant’s most abundant microbes as his views of life change dramatically.

References

External links 
 
 Full text online.

Hugo Award for Best Novella winning works
Australian science fiction novels
1998 science fiction novels
1998 novels
Works originally published in Asimov's Science Fiction
Works by Greg Egan
Short stories by Greg Egan
Australian novellas